Sir Kenneth Hagar Kemp  (21 April 1853 – 22 April 1936) was an English baronet, lawyer, soldier, banker and landowner who also played first-class cricket for the Marylebone Cricket Club (MCC) and Cambridge University in a few matches in the 1870s. He was born at Erpingham, Norfolk and died at Sheringham, also in Norfolk.

Cricket career
Kemp appeared in four first-class matches. He played once for MCC in 1872 and then in three games while he was at Cambridge University in 1873, though in only one of the three did he appear for the university side – he played against the university for an MCC team and a side that was called "An England XI". He was a middle- or lower-middle-order batsman and for the "England" team he bowled three overs without taking a wicket; his highest score was also in that game with an innings of 41.

Though Kemp's senior cricket ended in 1873, he continued to play in non-first-class MCC matches for the next decade and more, and also appeared in non-first-class games for the Norfolk county side which was founded in 1876.

Career outside cricket
Kemp was the son of Nunn Robert Pretyman Kemp, a Norfolk clergyman; he owed his middle name to his mother, who had been a Miss Hagar. His father died when he was six years old, and Kemp was then educated at the Clergy Orphan School in Canterbury, followed by Jesus College, Cambridge. In 1874, following the deaths of two elderly and childless cousins (and the death the previous year of his own elder brother), he inherited the Kemp baronetcy which dated from 1642 and which brought him ownership of Gissing Hall in Norfolk and substantial landholdings.

Following graduation from Cambridge University in 1875, Kemp had a varied career. He joined the British Army as a second lieutenant, but also trained as a lawyer, being called to the bar in 1880. He was also a partner in the Norfolk bank, Lacon Youell & Kemp, and in the 1895 general election and the 1899 by-election he stood for the Conservatives in the North Norfolk constituency, unsuccessfully.

Kemp's military and legal careers lasted for many years. He served with the Norfolk Regiment in South Africa from 1899 to 1902 and was colonel of the Third Battalion, a Territorial Army unit from 1904 to 1910. During the First World War, he was a colonel in the 2nd (Garrison) Battalion of the Suffolk Regiment before returning to the Norfolk Regiment at a colonel; at the end of the war he was appointed Commander of the Order of the British Empire "for valuable services rendered in connection with the War". As a lawyer, he was the author of a book on the Law of Allotments and practised as a barrister on the South-East Circuit.

Family
Kemp married Henrietta Hamilton in 1876; they had one son, Richard Hamilton Kemp, and four daughters. Richard Kemp predeceased his father and left two daughters of his own, so the baronetcy became extinct on Kenneth Kemp's death in 1936.

References

1853 births
1936 deaths
English cricketers
Cambridge University cricketers
Marylebone Cricket Club cricketers
Baronets in the Baronetage of England
Commanders of the Order of the British Empire
People from Erpingham
People educated at St Edmund's School Canterbury
Alumni of Jesus College, Cambridge